Towards the Republic, also known as For the Sake of the Republic and Zou Xiang Gong He, is a Chinese historical television series first broadcast on CCTV in China from April to May 2003. The series is based on events which occurred in China in the late 19th century and early 20th century, and led to the collapse of the Qing dynasty and the founding of the Republic of China. Because the series portrayed historical issues to which the current Chinese government remains politically sensitive, the series has been subjected to censorship in mainland China.

Plot
The series concentrates on various important events of the late Qing dynasty and Republican era in the late 19th century and early 20th century in China, including the First Sino-Japanese War (1894–1895), the Hundred Days' Reform (1898), the Boxer Rebellion (1900), and the Xinhai Revolution (1911).

The series narrates historical events and portrays the private lives of key political figures such as Li Hongzhang, the Guangxu Emperor, Yuan Shikai and Sun Yat-sen. There are monarchists, reformers and revolutionaries who provide different answers to addressing the deteriorating situation of the Qing dynasty but all these answers point towards a common goal – to restore China as a sovereign, international and independent power.

Cast

Lead roles
 Wang Bing as Li Hongzhang
 Lü Zhong as Empress Dowager Cixi
 Ma Shaohua as Sun Yat-sen
 J. René Godin as Alfred von Waldersee
 Sun Chun as Yuan Shikai
 Li Guangjie as Guangxu Emperor

Supporting roles

 Xu Min as Yikuang (Prince Qing)
 Jiang Nan as Empress Dowager Longyu
 Zheng Tianyong as Prince Gong
 Hao Zi as Zaizhen
 Hao Bojie as Zaize
 Asiru as Consort Zhen
 Ge Zhijun as Ronglu
 Zhang Ju as Weng Tonghe
 Liao Bingyan as Zhang Zhidong
 Jia Yiping as Tieliang
 Wen Haibo as Sheng Xuanhuai
 Liu Weiming as Zhang Jian
 Tian Xiaojie as Gu Hongming
 Han Yingqun as Ma Sanjun
 Su Mao as Deng Shichang
 Li Yonggui as Li Lianying
 Ma Xiaoning as Xiaodezhang
 Zheng Tianyong as Qu Hongji
 Sun Ning as Kang Youwei
 Zhang Han as Liang Qichao
 Li Chuanying as Huang Xing
 Qiao Lisheng as Song Jiaoren
 Zheng Yu as Xu Shichang
 Cai Wei as Li Yuanhong
 Ma Lun as Duan Qirui
 Yang Junyong as Ying Guixin
 Li Yi as Zhao Bingjun
 Yao Gang as Feng Guozhang
 Han Zaifen as Shen Yuying
 Yano Koji as Emperor Meiji
 Hirata Yasuyuki as Itō Hirobumi
 Nakamura Bunpei as Itō Sukeyuki
 Kuwana Waku as Mutsu Munemitsu
 Kamitani as Komura Jutarō
 Hoshino Akiraka as Saigō Tsugumichi

Censorship
The politically sensitive issues which likely triggered the heavy censorship of the series included issues such as the more sympathetic and complex portrayal of Empress Dowager Cixi, Yuan Shikai and Li Hongzhang, who are usually portrayed in a negative light in official Chinese historiography. Historically accurate but politically inconvenient quotes, such as Sun Yat-sen's speech on inequality and the suppression of democracy, were cut from the series.

The censorship has significantly reduced the length of some episodes. The final episode was cut to nearly half of its original duration of 50 minutes, and the series was reorganised from scripted 60 to aired 59 episodes. The censors also blocked plans for a rerun. The censorship, however, did not prevent the international distribution of the series on VCD and DVD (these versions also suffered less from censorship than the version aired on CCTV).

Reception
The series has been very popular in China. The debate caused by the series, as well as its censorship and issues for discussion, have been compared to a similar event in 1988 involving another documentary television series River Elegy. River Elegy drew criticism for presenting a controversial view on Chinese culture, and is seen as a factor that influenced the Tiananmen Square protests of 1989. Issues raised in discussions include questions on the extent to which artists are permitted to reinterpret history, and the degree to which certain portrayal of historical figures and events is dictated by politics rather than science. As a consequence of the controversy caused by this series, the Publicity Department of the Communist Party of China began an analysis of "the accuracy with which historical figures are represented in television dramas".

See also
 1911 (film)
 1911 Revolution (TV series)

References

Further reading
  Synopsis
 Matthias Niedenführ, "Re-writing history on Chinese TV: The series Zouxiang Gonghe (The road to the Republic)" in International Textbook Research no 1 (2005): 79–90.

External links
 
 Episode synopsis, on Representations of History in Chinese Film and Television
  Towards the Republic on Sina.com
  Towards the Republic official page on CCTV website
  有感于《走向共和》遭到封杀 - a reader's opinion on Towards the Republic being banned from the forums of Singapore's Chinese-language newspaper Lianhe Zaobao

China Central Television
Chinese documentary television series
Chinese period television series
Television series set in the Qing dynasty
2003 Chinese television series debuts
2003 Chinese television series endings
Mandarin-language television shows
Cultural depictions of Sun Yat-sen
Cultural depictions of Empress Dowager Cixi
Television censorship in China
Censored television series
Works about the 1911 Revolution